Hamden Khalif Allah Awad alias Ahmed the German (actually Egyptian) (August 13, 1970 – August 7, 1998) was one of the perpetrators of the 1998 United States embassy bombings in Kenya and Tanzania. He detonated the bomb in Tanzania, killing himself and 11 other people. In the 1998 indictment he is identified only as Ahmed the German. His real identity emerged later, from telephone calls made during this al-Qaeda conspiracy.

References

1970 births
1998 deaths
1998 suicides
20th-century criminals
Al-Qaeda bombers
Egyptian al-Qaeda members
Egyptian mass murderers
Islamist suicide bombers
Suicides in Tanzania
1990s murders in Tanzania
1998 crimes in Tanzania
1998 murders in Africa